Deolond is a village in the Shahdol district of Madhya Pradesh in India, situated at a distance of  from Rewa.

The village gets its name from Deol Rishi.

References 

Shahdol
Villages in Shahdol district